Hamar is a town in the municipality of Hamar in Innlandet county, Norway.

Hamar may also refer to:

People
Hamar people, an Omotic ethnic group from southeastern Ethiopia
Abdullah Al-Hamar, an Omani footballer who plays for Al-Nasr S.C.S
Fernand Hamar (1869-1943), a French sculptor
Imre Hamar, a professor of Chinese studies at Eötvös Loránd University in Budapest, Hungary
István Hamar, a Hungarian football player who currently plays for Vecsés FC

Places

Norway
Hamar Municipality, a municipality in Innlandet county, Norway
Hamar arch-deanery, an arch-deanery within the Church of Norway, based in the town of Hamar, Norway
Hamar Cathedral, a cathedral of the Church of Norway in the town of Hamar, Norway

Somalia
Hamar, one of the names of Mogadishu, a town in Somalia
Hamar Weyne District, a district in the southeastern Banaadir region of Somalia
Hamar Jajab District, a district in the southeastern Banaadir region of Somalia

Elsewhere
 Hamar, North Dakota

Sports
Hamar Ruins, an American football team based in Hamar, Norway
Hamar IL, a sports club based in Hamar, Norway

See also

Hammer (disambiguation)